Otuam (also Tantum) is a town in Ekumfi District, Central Region, Ghana.

Nana Amuah-Afenyi VI (born Peggielene Bartels in 1953), known informally as King Peggy, is the reigning chief of a clan (Ebriadze Abusua) of the town. She is  the head of one of the 7 major clans that form the Otuam township. Peggy has worked as a secretary at the Embassy of Ghana in Washington, D.C. since the 1970s.

History
It is the site where the Royal African Company built Fort Tantumquery in the 1720s.

References

Populated places in the Central Region (Ghana)